Dúzs is a village in Tolna County, Hungary.

References

Populated places in Tolna County